Park Myung-hoon (born May 28, 1975), is a South Korean actor. He made his acting debut as a stage actor in the 1999 play Class. He is best known internationally for his role as Geun-sae in the Academy Award winning film Parasite.

Filmography

Film

Television series

Television shows

Web series

Awards and nominations

References

External links
 
 

1975 births
Living people
20th-century South Korean male actors
21st-century South Korean male actors
South Korean male television actors
South Korean male film actors
South Korean male stage actors
South Korean male musical theatre actors
Outstanding Performance by a Cast in a Motion Picture Screen Actors Guild Award winners
Best New Actor Paeksang Arts Award (film) winners